Netaji Subhash Chandra Bose International Airport  is an international airport located in Kolkata, West Bengal, India, serving the Kolkata Metropolitan Area and is the aviation hub for eastern and northeastern India. The airport is locally known as Kolkata Airport and Dum Dum Airport before being renamed in 1995 after Netaji Subhas Chandra Bose, a prominent leader of the Indian independence movement. Opened in 1924, Kolkata Airport is one of the oldest airports in India.

The airport handled around 11 million passengers in the financial year 2021–22, making it the fifth-busiest airport in India in terms of passenger traffic after airports at Delhi, Mumbai, Bangalore, and Hyderabad. The airport is a major centre for flights to Northeast India, Bangladesh, Bhutan, Southeast Asia and the Middle Eastern cities of Dubai, Doha and Abu Dhabi.

History

Early history 
Netaji Subhash Chandra Bose International Airport was founded in the early 1900s as the Calcutta Aerodrome. The airport traditionally served as a strategic stopover on the air route from North America and Europe to Indochina and Australia. Dakota 3 was the first aircraft to land in the airport. In 1924, KLM began scheduled stops at Calcutta, as part of their Amsterdam to Batavia (Jakarta) route. The same year, a Royal Air Force aircraft landed in Calcutta as part of the first round-the-world expedition by any air force.

The airport began as an open ground next to the Royal Artillery Armoury in Dum Dum. Sir Stanley Jackson, Governor of Bengal, opened the Bengal Flying Club at Dum Dum/Calcutta aerodrome in February 1929. In 1930, the airfield was made fit for use throughout the year, and other airlines began to utilize the airport. Air Orient began scheduled stops as part of a Paris to Saigon route and Imperial Airways began flights from London to Australia via Calcutta in 1933, thus drew many airlines to Calcutta Airport. Many pioneering flights passed through the airport, including Amelia Earhart's in 1937.

Calcutta played an important role in the Second World War. In 1942, the United States Army Air Forces 7th Bombardment Group flew B-24 Liberator bombers from the airport on combat missions over Burma. The airfield was used as a cargo aerial port for the Air Transport Command and was also used as a communication centre for the Tenth Air Force.

Post-independence 

Passenger services grew after the Second World War. Calcutta became a destination for the world's first jet-powered passenger aircraft, the de Havilland Comet, on a British Overseas Airways Corporation (BOAC) route to London. Furthermore, in 1964 Indian Airlines introduced the first Indian domestic jet service, using Caravelle jets on the Calcutta–Delhi route. Between the 1940s and 1960s, the airport was served by several major airlines including Aeroflot, Air France, Alitalia, Cathay Pacific, Japan Airlines, Philippine Airlines, KLM, Lufthansa, Pan Am, Qantas, Swissair, and SAS.

Due to the introduction of longer-haul aircraft and the poor political climate of Calcutta during the 1960s, several airlines discontinued their service to the airport. The 1971 Bangladesh Liberation War saw a large increase of both refugees and disease in Calcutta, causing more airlines to cease services to the city. In 1975, the airport opened the first dedicated cargo terminal in India.

The 1990s saw new growth for Calcutta Airport, as the Indian aviation industry saw the arrival of new airlines such as Jet Airways and Air Sahara. A new domestic terminal named Terminal 2 was opened in 1995 making the international one Terminal 1, and the airport was renamed in honour of Netaji Subhas Chandra Bose. In 2000, a new international arrival hall was opened.

Modernisation

2005 saw the growth of low-cost carriers in the Indian aviation sector, with new airlines including SpiceJet, IndiGo, and Kingfisher Airlines. This led to a dramatic rise in passenger numbers at the airport. Overcrowding in both terminals led to the implementation of a comprehensive modernisation plan for the airport.

Work included an expansion of runway 01L/19R, rapid-exit taxiways and parking bays. A 119-year-old mosque that lies 30 metres from the runway' northern end prohibits further expansion in this direction. The longer runway, 01R/19L, was upgraded from CAT-I to CAT-II ILS status to allow landings in poor visibility. In August 2014, it was announced that the instrument landing system of the primary runway would be upgraded to CAT-IIIb. This allows flights to operate till visibility drops below 50 metres. The secondary runway would be upgraded to CAT-II. The  upgrading work started in February 2015 and was completed in January 2018.

The modernisation plan included some improvements of the airport's existing terminals, including the addition of extra ticketing counters, check-in kiosks, and cafes to the domestic terminal in 2009. However, the need to replace the airport's terminals entirely led to plans for a new integrated terminal, known as T2 to differentiate it from the older domestic block, to serve both international and domestic destinations. A Thai-based company, the Italian-Thai Development (ITD) Corporation (ITD-ITDCem JV, a consortium of ITD and ITD Cementation) and the 125-year-old iconic Project Management Consultant–Parsons Brinckerhoff (PB) was hired with Delhi-based designer Sikka Associates to construct the building. Construction commenced in November 2008, and T2 was inaugurated on 20 January 2013 after overshooting the previous deadlines of July 2011 and August 2012. The former airport hotel 'Ashok' was demolished to give way for two new five-star luxury hotels and a shopping mall in its place.

Commercial operations were intended to start on 23 January 2013, the 116th birth anniversary of Netaji Subhas Chandra Bose. However, the shift to the new terminal was only completed on 16 March 2013. Airports Council International named it the best improved airport in the Asia-Pacific region in 2014 and 2015.

Infrastructure

Runways
The airport has two parallel runways, The primary runway 01R/19L has a capacity of 35 flights per hour and the secondary runway 01L/19R has a capacity of 15 flights per hour. The secondary runway is used as a taxiway and the main runway is mainly used. When the primary runway is shut down for maintenance, the secondary runway is used.

Hangars and ground services
Air India operates hangars at the airport, while Bharat Petroleum and Indian Oil act as fuellers. Catering facilities are owned by Taj-Sats and Oberoi Flight Services.

Terminals

The terminal is an L-shaped structure, containing six levels. It contains 128 check-in counters that utilise CUTE (Common User Terminal Equipment) technology and has 78 immigration counters and twelve customs counters. Passenger lounges are provided by Air India. The terminal is equipped with 18 aerobridges and a further 57 remote parking bays. There are plans to construct an 18-foot bronze statue of Netaji Subhas Chandra Bose in the integrated terminal complex.

Kolkata's old international and domestic terminals closed permanently when the integrated terminal opened. However, the old international terminal may be used for future hajj services and is currently under renovation, and the domestic terminal may be used by regional airlines. An earlier proposal of continuing low-cost carrier operations from the existing domestic terminal has been shelved due to the need to fully utilise the new integrated terminal's capacity, making it the first airport in India to shift even its low-cost domestic airlines to the new integrated building upon completion.

In the financial year from April 2011 to March 2012, Kolkata Airport served 10.3 million passengers, 85% which were travelling domestically. The withdrawal of Lufthansa's service to Frankfurt in March 2012 left Kolkata with no direct connections beyond Asia. However, other international operations increased in 2012. The new terminal has attracted some airlines to expand their route networks to include Kolkata.

In September 2012, the Airports Authority of India upgraded the airport's cargo-handling capacity, enabling it to cater for the demand until 2015–16. There has been a 25 per cent growth in international cargo movement to and from Kolkata Airport and a 15 per cent increase in outward transit. Automobile parts accounted for the bulk of the growth in the movement of cargo from the city to other countries. In November 2008 the first Centre for Perishable Cargo (CPC) in West Bengal was opened at the airport. The CPC had been undergoing trials that started in June 2008 and were built with a  grant-in-aid from the Agricultural and Processed Food Products Export Development Authority (APEDA) part of the Commerce Ministry. The volume of export was 21,683 tonnes in 2008–09, during the current fiscal more than 23,042 tonnes of cargo were handled by the airport. Similarly, the volume of import cargo increased from 16,863 tonnes to 18,733 tonnes, increasing over ten per cent during the same period. However, in 2008–09 the total volume of cargo handled by the airport declined by 4.8% from the previous year. On 3 June 2019, Singapore Airlines operated the Airport's first Airbus A350 service from Singapore to Kolkata, enhancing the weekly seat capacity.

Expansion

The construction of the new terminal, as well as runway expansion, marked the end of Phase I of the project. AAI officials have announced that they are prepared to execute Phase 2 of the Kolkata Airport expansion plan. This involves the construction of a new ATC Tower to provide controllers with a better view of the planes at the new terminal. The building will be accompanied by a 4-storey office complex. Initially, a 112-meter tower was proposed, but the height has been revised multiple times and in 2017 it was decreased to 51.4 meter. The under construction tower is expected to be complete by late 2023.

New expansion plan 
The new terminal T2 inaugurated in 2013 is on the verge of reaching its annual capacity of 24 million passengers four years ahead of the initial projections. To tackle this, AAI has planned to upgrade and expand the airport and increase its passenger capacity by 100% to handle up to 40 million passengers annually. The new ₹1,000 crore expansion plan will be carried out in 2 phases. The number of parking bays will be increased to 105 by 2024.

Phase 1 
Airport officials said as per the first phase of the expansion plan, the old domestic terminal will be demolished and a 7000 sq. m. new building will be constructed in the area. The building will be linked with the existing terminal of the airport with the help of walkalators and would also have walk-in gates on the ground floor. This building will be used only for boarding and de-boarding of passengers. Passengers arriving in the boarding building would take the connecting bridge to the terminal and then leave the airport. This would reduce peak-hour congestion when several flights do not get enough apron space. This would immediately increase the passenger capacity by a few million and would solve the space crunch for the time being. The phase 1 expansion plan has been sanctioned by AAI.

Phase 2 
A master plan has been made for the construction of a third terminal that will increase the airport's passenger capacity to 45 million. The plan has received the first nod from the aviation ministry. The new terminal T1 will come up north of the current integrated terminal. The Air Traffic Navigation Building and the old international terminal that are situated beyond the old domestic terminal (which will become a passenger boarding building), will be demolished to make way for the new terminal T1, which is expected to house only domestic flights while the existing integrated terminal T2 will be allotted only to international flights. The construction of new hangars and bays is also part of the current expansion plan.

Airlines and destinations

Passenger

Cargo

Statistics 

As of the financial year 2019–20, Netaji Subhas Chandra Bose International Airport was again the fifth-busiest airport in India in terms of the total number of passengers served, which was about 22 million, 0.6% increase from the previous year. Out of which, 19 million passengers were domestic and 3 million were international. The cargo traffic saw a decline of 1.1% from its previous year, with 153,468 metric tonnes of cargo.

Connectivity

Roads
The airport has a well-established facility of prepaid taxis and air-conditioned buses connecting it to the city centre. As part of the larger modernisation programme, a flyover at Nagerbazar and an entry ramp on VIP Road have also been constructed. A  flyover from Kestopur to Raghunathpur (near Tegharia) was built to speed up airport-bound traffic. These reduced journey times to the airport. Parking facilities at the new terminal include two underground parking levels accommodating 3000 cars, as well as an outdoor car parking which can handle an additional 2000 cars.

West Bengal Transport Corporation (WBTC) operates air conditioned buses to major parts of Kolkata from 08:00 to 21:00 throughout the week.

Metro
Two new Kolkata Metro lines are under construction which will connect to the airport: one from Noapara (Yellow Line), and the other from New Garia (Orange Line). Both lines will converge at the Biman Bandar metro station. An American aviation planning firm has drafted a plan for a futuristic multi-modal transport hub at Kolkata Airport modelled on similar projects in European airports.

Rail
The airport was connected to the Kolkata Suburban Railway system's circular line branch. Electric multiple unit rolling stocks served the line. However, due to poor patronage and plans to replace it with metro service, the railway line was closed in September 2016 to facilitate construction of the new lines. The remaining infrastructure was dismantled in early 2020 to make space for road upgrades.

Presently, the nearest two rail stations are Durganagar railway station and Dum Dum Cantonment railway station.

Awards
In 2014 and 2015, the airport won the title of Best Improved Airport in the Asia-Pacific region awarded by the Airport Council International. The airport was awarded the Best Airport by Hygiene Measures in the Asia-Pacific in 2020 by Airports Council International.

Accidents and incidents 
On 2 May 1953, BOAC Flight 783 de Havilland Comet bound for Delhi crashed after takeoff from Calcutta Airport with the loss of 43 lives. Parts of the aircraft were found spread over an area of eight square miles, near Jugalgari, a village some 25 miles north-west of Calcutta, suggesting disintegration before impact with the ground.

On 12 June 1968, a Pan-Am Flight (N798PA, named Clipper Caribbean) Boeing 707-321C struck a tree 1128m short of the runway during a night-time visual approach in rain. The aircraft subsequently crashed and caught fire. The fuselage remained largely intact, although the aircraft's landing gear broke off. Out of the 10 crew and 53 passengers aboard, 1 crew member and 5 passengers suffered fatal injuries due to the fire.

 On 22 December 2015, a Jet Airways bus slammed into the side of an Air India Regional ATR 42-500 aircraft. There were no fatalities. An investigation revealed that the driver was sleeping.

See also
 Behala Airport
 Airports in India
 List of airports in West Bengal
 List of busiest airports in India by passenger traffic

References

External links

 

Airports in West Bengal
International airports in India
1937 establishments in India
Airports established in 1937
Buildings and structures in Kolkata
Transport in Kolkata
Airfields of the United States Army Air Forces in British India
Memorials to Subhas Chandra Bose
World War II sites in India
20th-century architecture in India